The Platte River Wilderness is primarily located in south central Wyoming, with a small section extending into Colorado in the United States. Located entirely within Medicine Bow - Routt National Forest, the wilderness was created in 1984 to protect the forestlands adjacent to the North Platte River. These forestlands were almost entirely consumed by the Mullen Fire in 2020.

The Wyoming section lies within the original Medicine Bow National Forest, whereas the Colorado section is in the original Routt National Forest; since 1995 these have been administratively combined.

U.S. Wilderness Areas do not allow motorized or mechanized vehicles, including bicycles. Although camping and fishing are allowed with proper permit, no roads or buildings are constructed and there is also no logging or mining, in compliance with the 1964 Wilderness Act. Wilderness areas within National Forests and Bureau of Land Management areas also allow hunting in season.

References

Protected areas of Albany County, Wyoming
Protected areas of Carbon County, Wyoming
Protected areas of Jackson County, Colorado
Wilderness areas of Wyoming
Wilderness areas of Colorado
Protected areas established in 1984
Medicine Bow National Forest
Routt National Forest
1984 establishments in Colorado
1984 establishments in Wyoming